Sweden competed at the 2006 Winter Paralympics in Turin, Italy.

Sweden entered 19 athletes in the following sports:

Alpine skiing: 1 male
Ice sledge hockey: 12 male
Nordic skiing: 1 female
Wheelchair curling: 4 male, 1 female

Medalists

See also
2006 Winter Paralympics
Sweden at the 2006 Winter Olympics

References

External links
Torino 2006 Paralympic Games
International Paralympic Committee
Svenska Handikappidrottsförbundet

2006
Nations at the 2006 Winter Paralympics
Winter Paralympics